Mariam Metwally may refer to:
 Mariam Ibrahim Metwally, Egyptian squash player
 Mariam Metwally (volleyball)